Kołczyn  is a village in the administrative district of Gmina Krzeszyce, within Sulęcin County, Lubusz Voivodeship, in western Poland.

The village has a population of 400.

Notable residents
Eva-Maria Hagen (1934–2022), actress

References

Villages in Sulęcin County